Procilia is a genus of shield bugs in the family Scutelleridae and the tribe Scutellerini described by Carl Stål in 1865.

Species
 Procilia morgani (White, 1839)
 Procilia nigricornis (Signoret, 1854)
 Procilia praetoria Stål, 1865
 Procilia scintillans (Stål, 1864)

References

Scutelleridae